Charm School is the first album by the indie rock group Bishop Allen released in 2003.

Track listing
"Charm School" – 2:08
"Little Black Ache" – 2:47
"Busted Heart" – 3:54
"Bishop Allen Drive" – 2:56
"Eve of Destruction" – 3:36
"Things Are What You Make of Them" – 3:57
"Ghosts Are Good Company" – 3:01
"Empire City" – 2:42
"Coupla Easy Things" – 2:22
"Penitentiary Bound" – 1:57
"Quarter to Three" – 3:21
"Another Wasted Night" – 2:32
"Things Are What You Make of Them (Reprise)" – 3:36

The track "Eve of Destruction" is partly based on P. F. Sloan's well-known song of the same name.

References

2003 debut albums
Bishop Allen albums